The Sex Noir (2,731 m) is a mountain of the Bernese Alps, located north of Anzère in the canton of Valais. It belongs to the massif of the Wildhorn and lies approximately halfway between the summit of the Wildhorn and the Prabé, on the range separating the valley of La Morge from the valley of La Sionne. Both rivers end in the Rhone.

References

External links
 Sex Noir on Hikr

Mountains of the Alps
Mountains of Switzerland
Mountains of Valais
Two-thousanders of Switzerland